Eupithecia nimbicolor is a moth in the family Geometridae first described by George Duryea Hulst in 1896. It is found in North America from eastern Newfoundland and Labrador to western British Columbia and from Alaska to Arizona.

The wingspan is 17–23 mm. Adults are grey and yellow or orange brown suffused. Adults are on wing from mid-May to mid-July in the north.

The larvae feed on the flowers of Achillea and Castilleja species and the foliage of Salix, Rosa, Potentilla fruticosa and Ribes species.

References

Moths described in 1896
nimbicolor
Moths of North America